Il provinciale (The Provincial) is a 1971 Italian comedy film directed by Luciano Salce.

Cast 

 Gianni Morandi: Giovanni
 Maria Grazia Buccella: Giulia 
 Sergio Leonardi: Sergio 
 Tery Hare: Silvana 
 Franco Fabrizi: Colombo 
 Renzo Marignano:  client of Giulia
 Corrado Olmi: the owner of the petrol station 
 Ennio Antonelli: Giovanni's neighbor

References

External links

1971 films
Italian comedy films
1971 comedy films
Films directed by Luciano Salce
1970s Italian films